is a Shinto shrine in Minato-ku, Nagoya, Aichi Prefecture, Japan.

Services

Annual Services
 January 1: New Year's Celebration
 Setsubun (in February): Setsubun Festival
 Vernal equinox: Ceremony for the spirits of the deceased of Tsukiji
 Around the Vernal Equinox: Service to comfort the spirits of people who have died working at Nagoya Port
 July 18: Nagoya Port's Summer Festival
 July 30: Chi-no-wakaguri, a Shinto purification ritual involving walking through a large ring of rope
 October 10: Kotohira-gū Festival and Izumo-taisha Festival
 October 23: this shrine's annual festival
 November 23: ceremonial offering by the Emperor of newly harvested rice to the deities
 Akihasan Hongū Akiha Jinja Festival
 December 31: New Year's Eve Festival and Purification Ceremony

Monthly Services
 Every month on the 1st, 15th, and 23rd: a monthly festival

References

Shinto shrines in Aichi Prefecture